Margareth Hagen is the elected rector of the University of Bergen from 2021-2025, and a professor of Italian literature. She was the University's elected deputy rector for research from 2017-2021, and Dean of the Humanities Faculty until 2017.

Academic career 
Hagen came to the University of Bergen as a student in the 1980s, first studying organisation and administration, and then Italian literature. She was interested in history, and in particular the 1500s, which she characterised as an exciting time of change in Italy, with the Counter-Reformation, the Inquisition and Machiavelli.

The anthology Literature and Chemistry: Elective Affinities, co-edited with Margery Skagen, marked a transition from literary studies to a broader engagement with the relationship between the humanities and the natural sciences. A reviewer describes the book as "an absorbing work both for those interested in chemistry as well as those fascinated with literature – and an absolute treasure for fans of both subjects", although he does remark that the view of chemistry in literature appears to be almost only negative: "the mad scientist in his laboratory seems to be the general view of the chemist in popular culture". Another reviewer praises the anthology's "mix of literary critics, chemists, and historians of science and medicine".

University leadership 
As the elected deputy rector, Hagen took over as rector in January 2021 when Dag Rune Olsen left before his term as rector was complete to take a position at the University of Tromsø.

Hagen became rector during the pandemic, and in an interview right after the election told reporters that bringing students back to campus and ensuring good social learning environments was extremely important.

References 

Academic staff of the University of Bergen
Rectors of the University of Bergen
Norwegian literary historians
Rectors of universities and colleges in Norway
1965 births
Living people